State Route 56 (SR 56) is a  state highway that runs south to north in Middle Tennessee, from the Alabama state line near Sherwood to the Kentucky state line near Red Boiling Springs.

SR 56 is secondary south of Sewanee. It is primary (but unsigned) along US 41A and US 41 between Sewanee and Tracy City. From Tracy City to the Kentucky line, SR 56 is a signed primary route, except west from North Springs to Willette, where SR 151 carries primary traffic more directly to Red Boiling Springs.

Route description

Alabama state line to McMinnville

SR 56 begins as a secondary state route at the Alabama state line south of Sherwood in Franklin County, (as a 2-lane) where the road continues south as Alabama State Route 117 into Jackson County, Alabama. SR 56 continues northward to the Crow Creek Valley, which is full of farmland, and passes through Sherwood before the highway becomes very curvy as it ascends into the Cumberland Plateau, passing through the Sherwood Forest, Carter State Natural Area, and Sewanee Natural Bridge portions of South Cumberland State Park.

SR 56 then enters Sewanee to become concurrent with US 41A/SR 15. The highway then turns east and becomes an unsigned primary highway. They have a junction with SR 156 in Saint Andrews before continuing to an interchange with I-24/US 64 (Exit 134) and entering Monteagle. They then have an intersection with US 41/SR 2, where both US 41A and SR 15 end and the roadway is taken over by US 41/SR 2, with SR 56 becoming concurrent with them as they enter downtown, straddling the line with Marion and Grundy Counties. After passing through downtown, they come to an intersection where SR 2 splits from US 41/SR 56, through it is unsigned, and US 41/SR 56 then continue east and leave Monteagle. They continue through countryside, passing by South Cumberland State Park visitor center and Grundy Forest State Natural Area portions of the park, before entering Tracy City, where SR 56 splits from US 41 to turn northward from Marion County into Grundy County, while US 41 turns south along unsigned SR 150. SR 56 continues north as a signed primary highway and passes through countryside and the community of Coalmont before becoming concurrent with SR 108 before entering Altamont. They enter downtown and have an intersection with SR 50 before SR 108 splits off and turns east. SR 56 continues north, where it has an intersection with Greeter Falls Road (which provides access to the Greeter Falls portion of Savage Gulf State Natural Area (South Cumberland State Park)), and passes through Beersheba Springs, where it has an intersection with Stone Door Road (which leads to the Stone Door portion of Savage Gulf State Natural Area (South Cumberland State Park)), before becoming curvy again as it descends the plateau before traveling up a narrow valley, where it passes through Irving College and runs parallel to the Collins River, before crossing into Warren County. SR 56 then continues on through farmland before entering into the city of McMinnville.

McMinnville to Silver Point 
SR 56 traverses the center of the city of McMinnville. It enters the city at the intersection with SR 127. It then proceeds north through a neighborhood before having a Y-Intersection with SR 8, before becoming E Colville Street and passing through a major business district and crossing a bridge over the Barren Fork River. It then curves to the west and has an intersection with SR 380 (Main Street), just before entering downtown and coming to an intersection with SR 55 Bus (Chancery Street). SR 56 then turns north again along Chancery Street straight through the middle of downtown before having another intersection with SR 380 and widening a 4-lane undivided highway (Smithville Highway) to leave downtown and run through a major business district. It then has an intersection with US 70S/SR 1 (Bobby Ray Memorial Parkway) before narrowing to 2-lanes and leaving McMinnville. SR 56 continues north through farmland to have an intersection with SR 287 before crossing into DeKalb County.

SR 56 proceeds northward to have an intersection with SR 288 before entering Smithville to have an intersection with US 70/SR 26 in downtown. It then has an intersection with SR 83 near Smithville Municipal Airport before leaving Smithville to enter mountains, and become curvy again, and cross into Putnam County.

SR 56 continues north zig-zagging and crisscrossing atop various mountains and ridges before crossing a bridge over Center Hill Lake. It then continues through the mountains before entering Silver Point to have an intersection with SR 141 before becoming concurrent with I-40 at Exit 273.

Interstate 40 to Whitleyville 
SR 56 runs concurrently with I-40 between exits 273 and 280. Old Baxter Road, the original SR 56 alignment from Silver Point to Baxter closely follows the interstate. After the junction with US 70N/SR 24, SR 56 continues northward through farmland and Bloomington Springs into Jackson County.

The highway then has an intersection and short concurrency with SR 290 in Center Grove before passing through some mountains and entering the town of Gainesboro. In downtown, SR 56 becomes concurrent with SR 53, and the two go north to the banks of the Cumberland River, where SR 53 splits from SR 56. SR 56 then becomes concurrent with SR 85 and SR 135 before crossing the river to leave Gainesboro. They continue through countryside to Jennings Creek, where SR 85 splits off, before heading on to Whitleyville, where SR 135 splits off via a Y-Intersection.

The route from I-40 to Gainesboro is known to residents of the Upper Cumberland as part of the Corridor J-1 project of the Appalachian Development Highway System, a unit of the Appalachian Regional Commission.

North Springs to the Kentucky state line 
SR 56 turns westward to meet SR 151 at North Springs, where SR 56 becomes a secondary route, enters Macon County, and makes a right turn to the north at the junction of SR 80 and SR 262 at Willette. SR 56 becomes primary again as the highway then enters farmland again and continues north to an intersection with SR 52 before entering Red Boiling Springs. It then continues into downtown to have another intersection with SR 151 before leaving Red Boiling Springs to continue north through farmland to end at the Kentucky state line. Upon reaching the Kentucky state line, the road continues as Kentucky Route 63 about south of Gamaliel.

Additional facts about the route
SR 56's entire course from Altamont to Gainesboro is a part of the Tennessee Scenic Parkway system.

History 
Before Interstate 40 was built in the 1960s, SR 56 went from Smithville to Silver Point, and right-turns to proceed up what is now the Old Baxter Road from Silver Point to Baxter, and then it went directly through the town of Baxter. After the interstate came through, a spur route was built to intersect with Exit 280 (the Baxter - Gainesboro exit) that bypasses Baxter.

The stretch of SR 56 between I-40 and Smithville was notorious for terrible curves prior to the late 1970s, but it was rebuilt and is now considered a good route to follow. Small sections of the original alignment that stil exist is now maintained by the county road departments of De Kalb and Puntam Counties.

SR 52 ran concurrently with SR 56 through Red Boiling Springs, and branched out eastward towards Clay County until 2003, when SR 52 was rerouted onto a bypass route around the city.

Major intersections

References

Tennessee Department of Transportation (24 January 2003). "State Highway and Interstate List 2003".

056
Transportation in Franklin County, Tennessee
Transportation in Marion County, Tennessee
Transportation in Grundy County, Tennessee
Transportation in Warren County, Tennessee
Transportation in DeKalb County, Tennessee
Transportation in Putnam County, Tennessee
Transportation in Jackson County, Tennessee
Transportation in Macon County, Tennessee